Oxyporus similis is a species of fungus in the Schizoporaceae family. A plant pathogen, it is found in the Pacific Northwest region of the United States, where it grows on the trunks of black cottonwood (Populus trichocarpa). It also affects peach and nectarines.

See also 
 List of peach and nectarine diseases

References 

Fungi described in 1925
Fungi of North America
Fungal tree pathogens and diseases
Stone fruit tree diseases
Hymenochaetales